Brunn is a municipality  in the Upper Palatinate (Oberpfalz) in the administrative district Landkreis Regensburg.

References

Regensburg (district)